This article shows the rosters of all participating teams at the 2022 Asian Women's Club Volleyball Championship in Semey, Kazakhstan.

Altay VC

The following is the roster of the Kazakhstani club Altay VC in the 2022 Asian Club Championship.
Head coach:  Marko Grsic

Barij Essence

The following is the roster of the Iranian club Barij Essence in the 2022 Asian Club Championship.
Head coach:  Fatemeh Shabankhamseh

Diamond Food–Fine Chef Sport Club

The following is the roster of the Thai club Diamond Food–Fine Chef Sport Club in the 2022 Asian Club Championship.
Head coach:  Kittikun Sriutthawong

Jizzakh State Pedagogical Institute
The following is the roster of the Uzbekistani club Jizzakh State Pedagogical Institute in the 2022 Asian Club Championship.
Head coach:  Kholmuminov Bakhriddin

Kuanysh VC
The following is the roster of the Kazakhstani club Kuanysh VC in the 2022 Asian Club Championship.
Head coach:  Dobreskov Darko

Kyrgyzstan VC
The following is the roster of the Kyrgyzstani club Kyrgyzstan VC in the 2022 Asian Club Championship.
Head coach:  Aisakhodzhiev Abdukhamid

References

Asian Women's Club Volleyball Championship